Arbeiter-Zeitung ('Workers Newspaper') was a newspaper in Luxembourg, the central organ of the Workers Party of Luxembourg 1924–1927. In 1927 another newspaper, Escher Tageblatt, became the main party organ.

Footnotes

1924 establishments in Luxembourg
1927 disestablishments in Luxembourg
Defunct newspapers published in Luxembourg
Newspapers established in 1924
Publications disestablished in 1927
Socialist newspapers